SS Henry S. Sanford was a Liberty ship built in the United States during World War II. She was named after Henry S. Sanford, a wealthy American diplomat and businessman from Connecticut who served as United States Minister to Belgium from 1861 to 1869. Sanford is also known for founding the city of Sanford, Florida, and for successfully lobbying the United States into recognizing King Leopold II's claim to the Congo region in central Africa.

Construction
Henry S. Sanford was laid down on 22 December 1943, under a Maritime Commission (MARCOM) contract, MC hull 2467, by the St. Johns River Shipbuilding Company, Jacksonville, Florida; she was sponsored by Miss Eleanor G. Huff, the daughter of Colonel P. Huff, US Army, and was launched on 19 February 1944.

History
She was allocated to the Overlakes Freight Corp., on 4 March 1944. On 28 May 1946, she was laid up in the National Defense Reserve Fleet, Olympia, Washington. On 22 April 1954, she was withdrawn from the fleet to be loaded with grain under the "Grain Program 1954", she returned loaded on 29 May 1954. On 27 January 1957, she was withdrawn to be unload, she returned on empty 5 February 1957. She was sold for scrapping, 7 August 1970, to Zidell Explorations, Inc. She was removed from the fleet on 21 September 1970.

References

Bibliography

 
 
 
 

 

Liberty ships
Ships built in Jacksonville, Florida
1944 ships
Olympia Reserve Fleet
Olympia Reserve Fleet Grain Program